Greg Mulcahy is an American novelist and short-story writer.

Early life
Mulcahy was born in St. Paul, Minnesota in 1958.

Career
Mulcahy's collection Out of Work was published by Alfred A. Knopf in 1993. It included a novella, Glass.  

His first novel, Constellation, was published in 1996. 

A second collection of stories, Carbine, was released in 2010 by University of Massachusetts Press as part of its Juniper Prize for Fiction series.

A second novel, O'Hearn, was released in 2015. Kirkus Reviews called it "an inventive but ultimately thin portrayal of workplace despair." 

His short fiction appeared frequently in Gordon Lish's The Quarterly and frequently appears in Diane Williams's NOON. His fiction has also been featured in such journals as Elimae, New York Tyrant, Caliban, The Gettysburg Review, Juked, Alice Blue Review, Sidebrow, Five Rrope, and Word Riot.

References

1958 births
Living people
Novelists from Minnesota
American male novelists
American male short story writers
American short story writers
20th-century American novelists
20th-century American male writers